The MSW Votec 252T is a single engine kitbuilt light-sport aircraft with side-by-side seating for two, designed and built in Switzerland and was first flown in 2009. By October 2011 only this first prototype has flown.

Design and development

The Votec 252T is a side-by side seat development of MSW's earlier tandem seat Votec 322. The prototype, powered by a modified Lycoming IO-540-J3A5 flat-six engine, marries the wooden wings and empennage of the latter to a new, carbon fibre fuselage, though a carbon fibre wing is under development. All flying surfaces are straight tapered and square tipped, the wing low mounted and the tailplane located on the upper fuselage; the rudder extends down to the keel. The ailerons are balanced with external spades.

The Votec 252T has a cabin over the wing, with baggage space behind the seat, under a single piece canopy. It has a fixed tricycle undercarriage with fuselage mounted cantilever legs and with speed fairings on all wheels. The nosewheel casters; there is a small tailskid for rudder protection.

The first prototype flew on 26 June 2009. A second prototype with a 260 kW (350 hp) Lycoming AEIO-580 engine, redesignated the Votec 352T, is under development but had not flown by October 2011.

Specifications (252T)

References

2000s Swiss sport aircraft
Homebuilt aircraft
Single-engined tractor aircraft
Low-wing aircraft
Votec 252
Aircraft first flown in 2009